Leokadiya Aleksandrovna Kashperova (16 May 1872 – 3 December 1940) was a Russian pianist and Romantic composer. She was the piano teacher of composer Igor Stravinsky.

Life

Early life and education
Leokadiya Kashperova was born in Lyubim, near Yaroslavl in 1872. She graduated first in 1893 from the St Petersburg Conservatoire at the culmination of her studies in Anton Rubinstein’s piano class, and a second time, in 1895, after studying composition with Nicolai Soloviev, conducting her cantata Orvasi.

Professional musical life
Over the following years, she composed works which included a symphony, a piano concerto, choral works, chamber music, piano solos and art-songs. Her works received public recognition, for example, The Russian Musical Gazette noted in 1912: "Her gifts as a composer are a most welcome phenomenon of St Petersburg’s musical life". For some time, she hosted regular musical evenings at her apartment in St Petersburg on Tuesdays.

In 1907 she undertook concert tours, to Berlin and twice to London. The Times (London, 1907) observed that "Mlle Kashperova’s music shows a decided talent, very attractive in its tunefulness, grace and Russian fitfulness of mood".

Bolshevik revolution and later life
In 1916, Kashperova became a teacher at the Smolny Institute, there she met Sergei Andropov, who was her student and a Bolshevik Leader, and in the same year they married.

However, when the February Revolution began, the Smolny Institute was being used as the headquarters for the revolution, to save themselves from being arrested the couple left Petrograd to the Rostov-on-Don. From 1918-20 she moved to Moscow (due to the Bolshevik success), but rarely performed until her final solo recital, an all-Beethoven programme, was given on 30 November 1920.

From then to her death, she composed in secret and became forgotten in the Soviet public. By the time she died she was mostly remembered by Stravinsky who called her "antiquated and a blockhead".

Selected Compositions
 2 Sonatas for piano & cello Op 1 (in G, op 1 no 1, and in E minor, op 1 no 2)
 Evening & night chorus a cappella
 In the midst of nature (suite for piano solo)
 Trio Violin, Violoncello Piano a-Moll
 Sredi prirody 
 Vecher i nochʹ
 Piano Concerto in A minor op. 2
 Songs of Love: 12 Romances soprano and piano
 Symphony in B minor op. 4 full orchestra
 The Eagle and the Snake: Ballad for low voice and piano

Legacy
In January 1910 Kashperova recorded seven piano rolls for the reproducing piano Welte-Mignon, six pieces by Mily Balakirev and one with own piano pieces.

In 2002, while doing his Doctor of Philosophy at Oxford, Graham Griffiths found Kaspherova's name while researching about Stravinsky. Soon, she became his main focus of research. He gave an interview to the BBC about Kashperova of which, after a lengthy period of neglect of Kashperova's music, during International Women’s Day 2018, BBC Radio 3 broadcast the final movement of Kashperova's Symphony in B minor (1905). Leokadiya Kashperova was featured as BBC Radio 3's Composer of the Week for the week commencing 12 December 2022.

References 

Notes

External links 

Biography by Freia Hoffmann, at Sophie Drinker Institut In German
A playlist created by Dr. Graham Griffiths about Leokadiya Kashperova, uploaded by Boosey & Hawkes

1872 births
1940 deaths
Russian composers
Russian pianists
Russian women pianists
Russian women classical composers
Russian classical composers
Saint Petersburg Conservatory alumni
Igor Stravinsky
Women classical pianists